Basser is a surname. Notable people with the surname include:
Herbert Basser (born 1942), Canadian scholar of religion and Jewish theologian
Michaël Chrétien Basser (born 1984), French-Moroccan footballer
Taha Abdul-Basser, Muslim Chaplain of Harvard University

See also
Basser College, residential college at the University of New South Wales in Sydney, Australia
Basser Library, the library of the Australian Academy of Science
Stade Francis Le Basser, multi-use stadium in Laval, France